Callville Bay is a waterway on the northwestern side of Lake Mead in the U.S. state of Nevada. It has a marina and camping resort. Situated east of Las Vegas and upstream from Las Vegas Bay, it lies within the Lake Mead National Recreation Area, which was established in 1935. Its name derives from the settlement of Callville which was established in 1865 by Anson Call under a directive led by Brigham Young. Though the settlement was abandoned in 1869, and submerged under Lake Mead when the Colorado River was dammed, Callville Bay retained the name.

History
The bay derives its name from the permanent settlement of Callville, known alternately as Call's Landing, Call's Fort, and Old Callville. The settlement, containing residences, a warehouse, and irrigation systems, was established in December 2, 1864 by Anson Call, James Whitmore, A. M. Cannon, Jacob Hamblin and son, under a directive to Call by Brigham Young. The steamboat port of Callville was used for shipping freight to Salt Lake City.  The bay was formed and the settlement was submerged after the Colorado River was dammed to form Lake Mead.

Features

A marina, created after the Hoover Dam was built, is a common launching point for boats onto the lake. It contains 589 boat slips; fishing boats and houseboats are available for rent. Callville also contains a restaurant,  lounge, small store, and campground accommodating for about 80 camps.

Geography
Callville settlement was located on the Muddy River in the extreme southeast section of Nevada. The bay is accessed from the land via Callville Bay Road, a turnoff from Callville Bay Junction. The topography is described as hilly, with no flood hazards near the developed area.

To the north lies Black Mesa, which is characterized by "pink, brown, and red-brown sandstone and siltstone" that lies by the Bitter Spring Valley fault. The nearby "Callville Mesa" is a flat-topped hill capped by volcanic rock. Flora include willows, oleanders, Russian olives, yuccas, palms, and pines trees.

References

Bibliography

External links
Official site

Lake Mead
Bays of Nevada
Marinas in the United States
Lakes of Clark County, Nevada